Jacques Doyasbère (Villeneuve-Saint-Georges, Val-de-Marne, 26 December 1919 - Paris, 3 November 1969) was a French thoroughbred racing jockey.

One of his country's top jockeys of all time, Doyasbère rode for such prominent owners as Marcel Boussac and François Dupré. During his career, he won virtually every important race in France more than once including a record four wins in the country's most prestigious event, the Prix de l'Arc de Triomphe.

Multiple race wins in France

 Grand Critérium: - 5 - 1941, 1942, 1943, 1945, 1947
 Grand Prix de Saint-Cloud: - 2 - 1942, 1945
 La Coupe de Maisons-Laffitte: - 2 - 1945, 1952
 Poule d'Essai des Pouliches: - 3 - 1942, 1943, 1944
 Prix d'Harcourt: - 3 - 1942, 1943, 1945
 Prix de Guiche: - 3 - 1943, 1944, 1953
 Prix de l'Arc de Triomphe: - 4 -  1942, 1944, 1950, 1951
 Prix d'Hédouville: - 5 - 1942, 1943, 1945
 Prix d'Ispahan: - 5 - 1942, 1943, 1945, 1946, 1947
 Prix du Cadran: - 3 - 1944, 1945, 1946
 Prix du Gros Chêne: - 2 - 1948, 1951
 Prix du Jockey Club: - 2 - 1944, 1945
 Prix du Prince d'Orange: - 2 - 1945, 1956
 Prix Eugène Adam: - 3 - 1943, 1946, 1951
 Prix Exbury: - 3 - 1942, 1945, 1949
 Prix Ganay: - 3 - 1942, 1951, 1957
 Prix Greffulhe: - 3 - 1944, 1947, 1954
 Prix Jacques Le Marois: - 3 - 1944, 1945, 1952
 Prix Kergorlay: - 4 - 1944, 1945, 1946, 1951
 Prix Maurice de Gheest: - 2 - 1938, 1943
 Prix Morny: - 5 - 1944, 1945, 1946, 1950, 1953
 Prix Noailles: - 2 - 1941, 1953
 Prix Robert Papin: - 2 - 1945, 1953
 Prix Royal-Oak: - 2 - 1942, 1945
 Prix de Pomone: - 2 - 1941, 1953

References

 France Galop list of races and jockeys

1919 births
1969 deaths
Sportspeople from Villeneuve-Saint-Georges
French jockeys